North Muskegon Public Schools is a public school district located in North Muskegon, Michigan. It is a constituent of the Muskegon Area Intermediate School District in Muskegon County.

It has an elementary school, middle school, and high school, all situated in one building.

The School was recently awarded a Bronze Medal after their review of high schools throughout the country. The school is relatively small compared to its counterparts and has an average graduating class size of 60-80 pupils. North Muskegon Public Schools continues to perform with top tier schools in Muskegon County despite its size.

In 2010, North Muskegon High School was noted as the top performing public school in the State of Michigan by the state Department of Education.

External links
 North Muskegon Public Schools

References 

School districts in Michigan
Education in Muskegon County, Michigan